Penicillium macrosclerotiorum is a species of the genus of Penicillium which was isolated from soil in south China.

References

Further reading 
 

macrosclerotiorum
Fungi described in 2007